William Takaku (died 3 January 2011) was a Papua New Guinean film, television and theatre actor.  He was also a screenwriter and a former theatre director.

Career
In the late 1980s and early 1990s, he travelled far from his birthplace on the island of Bougainville, as a storyteller and spokesperson for his people. They had recently expelled from the island copper mining operations which had been polluting the river they depended upon. In June 1991, he was a guest speaker and storyteller at the International Gathering of Mother Earth's People, in Winnipeg, Manitoba, Canada.

Education.
In 1975, as a celebration of Independence, William and a PNG colleague, Matalau, were chosen by the director of NIDA (Australia’s National Institute of Dramatic Art, in Sydney) to undertake a year-long special Acting Course.  He studied under Alexander Hay with other teachers including Keith Bain, Jicky Martin and Aubrey Mellor. Other students in their cohort were Mel Gibson, Judy Davis and Steve Bisley.  He acted roles in Shakespeare’s A Midsummer Night’s Dream (Puck), The Tempest (Caliban) and Chekhov’s Swan Song (Svetlovidov).

In 1981, William returned to NIDA to complete the Dilploma in Directing.  In the Directing Course he studied along with Gale Edwards, Mark Gaal and Musa bin Musa.

He was for a time director of the National Theatre Company in Papua New Guinea.

He co-wrote, with Albert Toro, and directed the television miniseries Warriors in Transit (1992).  Takaku has also directed the Milne Bay Provincial Theatre Group.

As an actor, he co-starred as Man Friday alongside Pierce Brosnan in the film Robinson Crusoe (1997) and he appeared as Magnus in the television miniseries The Violent Earth (1998).

Unpublished Plays by William Takaku *(6)
1980, Eberia.
1985, Medea.
A Dream for Melanesia.
For Our Tomorrow.
Gilgamesh.
The Jawsharp Mosquitoes.
Judgement of the Birds.
On Coughs, Colds and Pneumonia.
On Tuberculosis.
Pekato bilong Man, (adaptation of Fall of Man by Ulli Beier)
The Principal.
The Rain Tree.
Tru Tru Man.

Plays by Takaku performed in the National Theatre Repertoire 1974-1982 *(6)
Eberia                        Musical Legend      1980
Flying Fox                  Skit – with Golila Pepe
Gilgamesh                 One Act Play
National Puppet Show      With Oliver Sublette
Olpela Akta               Two-hander based on Chekhov’s Swan Song
Pekato Bilong Man          Social comedy adapted from Ulli Beier
The Principal              Social Issue Drama
The Rain Tree              Environmental play

(6)  Painim Rot: Making New Roads. The Published Plays of Papua New Guinea.  Stonehouse, Gary.  NIDA Conversion  2001.

Filmography

References

6.  *  Painim Rot: Making New Roads. The Published Plays of Papua New Guinea.  Stonehouse, Gary.  NIDA Conversion  2001.

External links
 

Year of birth missing
2011 deaths
Papua New Guinean actors
People from the Autonomous Region of Bougainville